Kimki (Aipki) or Sukubatom (Sukubatong) is a South Pauwasi language of Batom District, Pegunungan Bintang Regency, Papua, Indonesia. Foley classifies Kimki as a language isolate, although he notes some similarities with Murkim. Usher demonstrates a connection to the other South Pauwasi languages.

An automated computational analysis (ASJP 4) by Müller et al. (2013) found lexical similarities with Pyu. However, since the analysis was automatically generated, the grouping could be either due to mutual lexical borrowing or genetic inheritance.

Dialects include the varieties spoken in Batom and Sabi villages (Rumaropen 2004).

Pronouns
Pronouns are:
{| 
|+ Kimki independent pronouns
!  !! sg !! pl
|-
! 1
| win || name
|-
! 2
| fume || same
|-
! 3
| colspan="2" style="text-align: center;" | mame
|}

Basic vocabulary
Basic vocabulary of Kimki listed in Foley (2018):

{| 
|+ Kimki basic vocabulary
! gloss !! Kimki
|-
| ‘bird’ || ã
|-
| ‘blood’ || afupla
|-
| ‘bone’ || kwal
|-
| ‘breast’ || mua
|-
| ‘ear’ || bwa
|-
| ‘eat’ || auko
|-
| ‘egg’ || im
|-
| ‘eye’ || ẽ
|-
| ‘fire’ || kamop
|-
| ‘give’ || an
|-
| ‘go’ || bi ~ kaik
|-
| ‘ground’ || nim
|-
| ‘hair’ || it
|-
| ‘hear’ || fas
|-
| ‘leg’ || up
|-
| ‘louse’ || nim
|-
| ‘man’ || ap
|-
| ‘moon’ || lokaya
|-
| ‘name’ || aip ~ mi
|-
| ‘one’ || amatri
|-
| ‘road, path’ || bagin
|-
| ‘see’ || weː
|-
| ‘sky’ || fim
|-
| ‘stone’ || kwil
|-
| ‘sun’ || bwakaya
|-
| ‘tongue’ || albak
|-
| ‘tooth’ || luː
|-
| ‘tree’ || maul
|-
| ‘two’ || alas
|-
| ‘water’ || dɪ
|-
| ‘woman’ || kiam
|}

Sentences
Some example sentences in Kimki from Rumaropen (2004), as quoted in Foley (2018):

Only 12 sentence examples are given by Rumaropen (2004). Other than that, there are virtually no other sentences and texts available for Kimki.

References

Languages of western New Guinea
South Pauwasi languages